A sgoldstino is any of the spin-0 superpartners of the goldstino in relativistic quantum field theories with spontaneously broken supersymmetry. The term sgoldstino was first used in 1998.

In 2016, Petersson and Torre hypothesized that a sgoldstino particle might be responsible for the observed 750 GeV diphoton excess observed by Large Hadron Collider experiments.

References

Supersymmetric quantum field theory
Bosons
Hypothetical elementary particles
Subatomic particles with spin 0